The New Jersey General Assembly is the lower house of the New Jersey Legislature. The following is the roster and leadership positions for the 2012–13 term. The 215th session began on January 10, 2012, and ended on January 14, 2014.

This assembly was preceded by the 2010–2012 assembly and was followed by the 2014–2015 assembly.

Composition

Members at the end of the term

† First appointed to the seat.
1 Ralph Caputo served in the Assembly as a Republican from 1968–1972.
2 Sean Kean served in the Assembly from 2002–2008 and in the State Senate from 2008–2012.
3 Paul Contillo served in the Assembly from 1974–1980 and in the State Senate from 1984–1992.

Former members from this term

See also
 List of New Jersey state legislatures

Notes

References

External links
New Jersey Legislature

2012-2013
2010s in New Jersey